Lincoln Township is a township in Franklin County, Kansas, United States.  As of the 2000 census, its population was 797.

Geography
According to the USGS, it contains two cemeteries: Chippewa Hills and Muncie.

The streams of Blue Creek, Harrison Branch, Mud Creek and Robinson Creek run through this township.

Transportation
Lincoln Township contains two airports or landing strips: Camp Chippewa Airport and Lemaster Field.

References
 USGS Geographic Names Information System (GNIS)

External links
 US-Counties.com
 City-Data.com

Townships in Franklin County, Kansas
Townships in Kansas